Inna Kristianne Beza Palacios (born February 8, 1994) is a Filipino footballer who plays as a goalkeeper for the Philippines women's national team.

Early life
Inna Palacios was born on February 8, 1994 in Manila, Philippines. She started playing football at age 4.

Football career

Youth
Palacios attended Colegio de San Agustin-Makati and won at least 5 MVP awards and some tournaments with her school's football team. She started playing for her school's team at grade 4. Before playing as a goalkeeper, she tried playing as a forward, winger and a defender.

Collegiate
Palacios decided to study at De La Salle University and play for their varsity team. She was scouted by La Salle coach, Hans Smit during her stint with the national team in 2012. She was also scouted by the coaches of Ateneo and University of the Philippines.

On her rookie year with De La Salle, Palacios dealt with several issues that led her to almost quitting from football; the death of her grandmother while she was away from the country while playing for the Philippine national team and recovering from a recurring injury. Smit allowed Palacios to recover physically and emotionally and was able to regain her form. Inna Palacios established herself as the first-choice goalkeeper of her varsity team and was able to receive the best goalkeeper award at UAAP Season 75 and UAAP Season 77 which ended in 2013 and 2015 respectively. She scored a goal in her final game for De La Salle.

Club
By 2022, Palacios has been with Kaya F.C., helping the club win the SingaCup in Singapore.

International
In 2007, at age 13, Palacios was called up to play for the Philippine under-16 national team. She was later called up to join the senior national team as part of the reserves that played in an friendly tournament in Hong Kong and also participated at the 2012 AFF Women's Championship. She also played for the under-19 national team at the 2013 AFC U-19 Women's Championship qualification.

Palacios is a consistent member of the senior national team. She helped the Philippines qualify for the 2019 AFC Asian Cup which included a crucial 1–1 draw with Bahrain but did not feature any match in the continental tournament itself due to Rabah Benlarbi, who was hired to lead the national team for just the tournament, preferred to field a newcomer instead. She played again for the national team in the 2020 Summer Olympics Asian qualifiers where the Philippines managed to progress from the first round.

Honours

International

Philippines
Southeast Asian Games third place: 2021
AFF Women's Championship: 2022

References

1994 births
Living people
Sportspeople from Manila
Footballers from Metro Manila
Filipino women's footballers
Women's association football goalkeepers
De La Salle University alumni
University Athletic Association of the Philippines footballers
Philippines women's international footballers
Competitors at the 2017 Southeast Asian Games
Competitors at the 2019 Southeast Asian Games
Southeast Asian Games bronze medalists for the Philippines
Southeast Asian Games medalists in football
Competitors at the 2021 Southeast Asian Games